KDWR-LP is a low-power FM radio station on 92.9 FM licensed to serve Desert Ridge, Arizona. The station is owned and operated by Walk and Talk, Inc., with transmitter on Cave Creek Road in Phoenix. It carries Bible readings as "Desert Word Radio".

External links
 

DWR-LP
Radio stations established in 2017
2017 establishments in Arizona
DWR-LP